David Joseph Margulies (February 19, 1937 – January 11, 2016) was an American actor.

Early life 
Margulies was born in Brooklyn, New York City, the son of Runya (née Zeltzer), a nurse and museum employee, and Harry David Margulies, a lawyer. He graduated from City College of New York.

Career 
Margulies made his stage debut in the off-Broadway play Golden 6 (1958). In that same year, he joined the American Shakespeare Festival as an apprentice, which led to his receiving an Actors' Equity Association contract for the 1960 theater season. His first Broadway appearance was in the 1973 revival of The Iceman Cometh.

His film credits include The Front (1976), Last Embrace (1979), All That Jazz (1979), Hide in Plain Sight (1980), Dressed to Kill (1980), Times Square (1980), I'm Dancing as Fast as I Can (1982), Daniel (1983), Ghostbusters (1984), Brighton Beach Memoirs (1986), 9½ Weeks (1986), Ishtar (1987), Running on Empty (1988), Ghostbusters II (1989), Out on a Limb (1992), A Stranger Among Us (1992), Ace Ventura: Pet Detective (1994), and Fading Gigolo (2013).

His television credits include Kojak, Tales from the Darkside, Spenser: For Hire, The Days and Nights of Molly Dodd, Chicago Hope, NYPD Blue, Northern Exposure, Touched by an Angel, four episodes of Law & Order, and eight episodes of The Sopranos as mob boss Tony Soprano's lawyer Neil Mink.

Personal life 
Margulies died on January 11, 2016, of cancer in Manhattan, New York, at the age of 78. He was survived by his partner, actress Lois Smith, as well as his son Johnathon and his grandson from his marriage which had ended in divorce.

Filmography 

 Scarecrow in a Garden of Cucumbers (1972) as Walter Mitty (film debut)
 The Front (1976) as Phelps
 Last Embrace (1979) as Rabbi Josh Drexel
 All That Jazz (1979) as Larry Goldie
 Night-Flowers (1979) as Psychiatrist
 Hide in Plain Sight (1980) as Detective Reilly
 Dressed to Kill (1980) as Dr. Levy
 Times Square (1980) as Dr. Zymansky
 I'm Dancing as Fast as I Can (1982) as Walter Kress
 Daniel (1983) as Dr. Duberstein
 Ghostbusters (1984) as Mayor Lenny Clotch
 Tales from the Darkside (1985, "Distant Signals" TV episode) as Gil Hurn
 9½ Weeks (1986) as Harvey
 Brighton Beach Memoirs (1986) as Mr. Farber
 Candy Mountain (1987) as Lawyer
 Ishtar (1987) as Mr. Clarke
 Magic Sticks (1987) as Goldfarb
 Running on Empty (1988) as Dr. Jonah Reiff
 Ghostbusters II (1989) as Lenny Clotch, The Mayor of New York City
 Funny About Love (1990) as Dr. Benjamin
 Law & Order (1991–2004, TV) as Various Roles
 A Stranger Among Us (1992) as Lt. Oliver
 Out on a Limb (1992) as Mr. Buchenwald
 Day of Atonement (1992) (English version, voice)
 Family Prayers (1993) as Uncle Sam
 Ace Ventura: Pet Detective (1994) as Doctor
 The Adventures of Young Indiana Jones: Hollywood Follies (1994, TV) as Carl Laemmle
 Hudson River Blues (1997) as Stan
 Lifebreath (1997) as Abe Gross
 Celebrity (1998) as Counselor Adelman
 Man of the Century (1999) as Mr. Meyerscholtz
 Looking for an Echo (2000) as Dr. Ludwig
 The Sopranos (2000–2007, TV) as Neil Mink
 Touched by an Angel (2001, TV) as Sam Silverstein
 Bought & Sold (2003) as Kutty Nazarian
 Invitation to a Suicide (2004) as Roman Malek
 Whiskey School (2005) as Rex Michaels
 Ira & Abby (2006) as Dr. Arnold Friedman
 Noise (2007) as Heart Attack Man
 All Good Things (2010) as Mayor
 Roadie (2011) as Don Muller
 The Girl on the Train (2013) as Morris Herzman
 Fading Gigolo (2013) as Chief Rebbe
 A Most Violent Year (2014) as Saul Lefkowitz
 Law & Order: Special Victims Unit (2015, TV) as Dr. Eric Setrakian
 License Plates (2016) as Jacob
 Madoff as Elie Wiesel
 Adam Bloom (2016) as Harris Sutton (final film)
 Curmudgeons (2016, Short) as Ralph (released posthumously)

Additional Broadway credits 
 Comedians (1976)
 The West Side Waltz (1981)
 Brighton Beach Memoirs (1983)
 Conversations with My Father (1992)
 Angels in America: Millennium Approaches (1993)
 Angels in America: Perestroika (1993)
 A Thousand Clowns (1996 revival)
 45 Seconds from Broadway (2001)
 Wonderful Town (2003 revival)

References

External links 
 
 
 

1937 births
2016 deaths
20th-century American male actors
21st-century American male actors
American male film actors
American male stage actors
American male television actors
City College of New York alumni
Jewish American male actors
Male actors from New York City
People from Brooklyn
21st-century American Jews